The abbey of Santa María la Real de la Oliva, or simply La Oliva, is a Cistercian monastery in Carcastillo, Navarre, Spain. 

An example of Romanesque architecture, the buildings have been protected by a heritage listing since 1880, and the site is currently classed as a Bien de Interés Cultural, the Ex-monasterio Cisterciense de Santa María de la Oliva.

Description

A Cistercian Monastery established in the 12th century, the present buildings date from 13th - 15th centuries.

History
Construction at the site is attributed first in 1134 to King García Ramírez of Navarre, known as the restorer.
This king died in 1150 and the same year the abbey was founded, or refounded, as a daughter house of the Morimond and Escaladieu Abbeys.

After the dissolution of the monastery the retable was moved to Tafalla.

See also 
 List of Bien de Interés Cultural in Navarre

References

External links

Official website 

Bien de Interés Cultural landmarks in Navarre
Maria Oliva
Cistercian monasteries in Spain
12th-century Roman Catholic church buildings in Spain
Maria Oliva
Romanesque architecture in Navarre